Brie is a commune in the Ariège department of southwestern France. The commune is located on the slopes between the rivers Ariège and Lèze. It borders the department of Haute-Garonne. The mayor is Isabelle Peyrefitte.

Population

In 2017, the commune had 219 inhabitants, an increase of 31% compared to 2007. Inhabitants of Brie are called Briençais.

See also
Communes of the Ariège department

References

Communes of Ariège (department)
Ariège communes articles needing translation from French Wikipedia